Ervin Bossányi (3 March 1891 in Rigyica / Riđica, Austria-Hungary – 11 July 1975 in Eastcote in Greater London, England) was a Hungarian artist, who worked mainly in northern Germany until his emigration in 1934. He then started a new career as a notable stained glass artist in England.

Biography
Bossányi was born in a small village in southern Austria-Hungary and educated in Budapest. In World War I he was interned for five years in France. After the war he became a notable painter and sculptor in Lübeck and (1929) in Hamburg. A major work from this period is his fountain in Bad Segeberg. 1934 he left Nazi Germany for England. Here he specialized with remarkable success in stained glass.
He made stained glass windows for the University of London (Goldsmiths Library in the Senate House Library), Tate Gallery ("The Angel Blesses the Women Washing the Clothes"), the Victoria and Albert Museum ("Noli me tangere"), as well as cathedral glass for the York Minster, the memorial chapel for President Woodrow Wilson in Washington National Cathedral in Washington D.C. and Canterbury Cathedral. He also created the windows in the chapel at Michaelhouse in South Africa, and the stained glass window at Uxbridge tube station in London.

Museums
 The Stained Glass Museum at Ely Cathedral owns two windows Bossanyi made in his last year in Hamburg and which he took with him into emigration.
 Behnhaus, Lübeck - paintings

References
 Dagmar Hayes: Ervin Bossanyi, the splendour of stained glass. Canterbury: Friends of Canterbury Cathedral, 1965.
 Abram Enns: Lübecker Jahre eines Malers 1919-1929 - Erwin Bossanyi zum 80. Geburtstag in: Der Wagen 1972 S.138 ff mit umfangreichen Abbildungen
 Abram Enns: Kunst und Bürgertum, S. 199 ff, Lübeck 1978, 
 Geoffrey Fouquet: Ervin Bossanyi. Oxford: Ashmolean Museum in association with the Bossanyi Trustees, 1979.
 Bossányi Ervin 1891 - 1975 emlékkiállítása. Magyar Nemzeti Galéria 1980 április - május. Türr István Múzeum, Baja 1980 június - augusztus / [a kiállítást rendezte ... Szinyei Merse Anna]. Budapest: Magyar Nemzeti Galéria (National Gallery), 1980.
 Friedrich Gleiss: Jüdisches Leben in Segeberg vom 18.-20. Jahrhundert, S. 116-126, Norderstedt 2002, 
 Heiner Stiebeling: Unbekannter Bossanyi: 14 Aquarelle zu Paul Claudels Verkündigung, in: Der Wagen 1984, S. 81-98 mit Abb.
 Jo Bossanyi: Leben und Arbeit des Künstlers Ervin Bossanyi von 1920 bis 1934 in Norddeutschland''. Lübeck: Bibliothek der Hansestadt Lübeck 1999 (Veröffentlichungen der Stadtbibliothek Lübeck: Reihe 3; Bd. 5)
 Allgemeines Künstlerlexikon Vol. XIII, 1996, Seite 198

External links
 Bossanyi at the Tate Gallery London
 Bossanyi The Stained Glass Museum, Ely Cathedral, Cambridgeshire

References

1891 births
1975 deaths
British stained glass artists and manufacturers
People associated with the University of London
20th-century Hungarian painters
20th-century Hungarian male artists
20th-century Hungarian sculptors
Académie Julian alumni
Hungarian male painters